Nikolay Khomeriki (born 17 April 1975) is a Russian film director and screenwriter. He has directed six films since 2004. His film 977 was screened in the Un Certain Regard section at the 2006 Cannes Film Festival. Three years later his film Tale in the Darkness competed in the same section at the 2009 Cannes Film Festival.

Filmography
 Tempête (2004)
 Vdvoyom (2005)
 977 (2006)
 Belyaev (2009)
 Tale in the Darkness (2009)
 Heart's Boomerang (2011)
 The Icebreaker (2016)
 Selfie (2018)
 White Snow (2021)
 More volnuetsya raz (2021)

References

External links

1975 births
Living people
Russian film directors
Russian screenwriters
Male screenwriters
Russian male writers